Robert Goff may refer to:

 Robert Goff, Baron Goff of Chieveley (1926–2016), British judge
 Robert Goff (American football) (born 1965), American football player
 Robert Charles Goff (1837–1922), printmaker and painter